Atropa belladonna, commonly known as belladonna or deadly nightshade, is a toxic perennial herbaceous plant in the nightshade family Solanaceae, which also includes tomatoes, potatoes, and eggplant (aubergine). It is native to Europe, North Africa, and Western Asia. Its distribution extends from Ireland in the west to western Ukraine and the Iranian province of Gilan in the east. It is also naturalised or introduced in some parts of Canada and the United States.

The foliage and berries are extremely toxic when ingested, containing tropane alkaloids. These toxins include atropine, scopolamine, and hyoscyamine, which cause delirium and hallucinations, and are also used as pharmaceutical anticholinergics. Tropane alkaloids are of common occurrence not only in the Old World tribes Hyoscyameae (to which the genus Atropa belongs) and Mandragoreae, but also in the New World tribe Datureae - all of which belong to the subfamily Solanoideae of the plant  family Solanaceae.

Atropa belladonna has unpredictable effects. The antidote for belladonna poisoning is physostigmine or pilocarpine, the same as for atropine.

History
Atropa belladonna has a long history of use as a medicine, cosmetic, and poison. Known originally under various folk names (such as "deadly nightshade" in English), the plant was named Atropa belladonna by Carl Linnaeus (1707–1778) when he devised his classification system. Linnaeus chose the genus name Atropa because of the poisonous properties of these plants. Atropos (lit. "unturning one"), one of the Three Fates in Greek mythology, is said to have cut a person's thread of life after  her sisters had spun and measured it. Linnaeus chose the species name belladonna ("beautiful woman" in Italian) in reference to the cosmetic use of the plant during the Renaissance, when women used the juice of the berries in eyedrops intended to dilate the pupils and make the eyes appear more seductive.

Extracts of plants in the deadly nightshade family have been in use since at least the 4th century BC, when Mandragora (mandrake) was recommended by Theophrastus for treatment of wounds, gout, and sleeplessness, and as a love potion. In the first century BC, Cleopatra used Atropine-rich extracts from the Egyptian henbane plant (another nightshade) for the above-mentioned purpose of dilating the pupils of her eyes. 

The use of deadly nightshades as a poison was known in ancient Rome, as attested by the rumour that the Roman empress Livia Drusilla used the juice of Atropa belladonna berries to murder her husband, the emperor Augustus.

In the first century AD, Dioscorides recognized wine of mandrake as an anaesthetic for treatment of pain or sleeplessness, to be given prior to surgery or cautery.
The use of nightshade preparations for anaesthesia, often in combination with opium, persisted throughout the Roman and Islamic Empires and continued in Europe until superseded in the 19th century by modern anaesthetics.

The modern pharmacological study of Atropa belladonna extracts was begun by the German chemist Friedlieb Ferdinand Runge (1795–1867). In 1831, the German pharmacist Heinrich F. G. Mein (1799–1864) succeeded in preparing a pure crystalline form of the active substance, named atropine.

Description 

Atropa belladonna is a branching herbaceous perennial rhizomatous hemicryptophyte, often growing as a subshrub from a fleshy rootstock. The bell-shaped flowers are dull purple tinged yellow-green toward the base and are faintly scented. The berries are sweet and are consumed by animals that disperse the seeds in their droppings, even though they contain toxic alkaloids (see Toxicity). There is a pale-yellow flowering form called Atropa belladonna var. lutea with pale yellow fruit.

A. belladonna is sometimes confused with the much less poisonous black nightshade, Solanum nigrum, belonging to a different genus within Solanaceae. A comparison of the fruit shows that black nightshade berries are spherical, have a dull lustre and grow in clusters, whereas the berries of deadly nightshade are much glossier, twice as large, somewhat flattened and are borne singly. Another distinction is that black nightshade flowers are not tubular but white and star-shaped, bearing a central cone of yellow anthers.

Distribution
Atropa belladonna is native to temperate southern, Central and Eastern Europe; North Africa, Turkey, Iran and the Caucasus, but has been cultivated and introduced outside its native range. In southern Sweden it was recorded in Flora of Skåne in 1870 as grown in apothecary gardens near Malmö.

In Britain it is native only on calcareous soils, on disturbed ground, field margins, hedgerows and open woodland. More widespread as an alien, it is often a relic of cultivation as a medicinal herb. Seed is spread mainly by birds.

It is naturalised in parts of North America, where it is often found in shady, moist locations with limestone-rich soils. It is considered a weed species in parts of the world, where it colonizes areas with disturbed soils.

Cultivation

Atropa belladonna is rarely used in gardens, but, when grown, it is usually for its large upright habit and showy berries.
Germination of the small seeds is often difficult, due to hard seed coats that cause seed dormancy. Germination takes several weeks under alternating temperature conditions, but can be sped up with the use of gibberellic acid. The seedlings need sterile soil to prevent damping off and resent root disturbance during transplanting.

Taxonomy
Atropa belladonna is in the nightshade family (Solanaceae), which it shares with potatoes, tomatoes, eggplants, jimsonweed, tobacco, wolfberry, and chili peppers. The common names for this species include belladonna, deadly nightshade, divale, dwale, banewort, devil's berries, death cherries, beautiful death, devil's herb, great morel, and dwayberry.

Etymology
The name Atropa belladonna was published by Carl Linnaeus in Species Plantarum in 1753. Atropa is derived from the name of the Greek goddess Atropos ('she who may not be turned aside' i.e. 'the inflexible' or 'the implacable')—one of the three Greek fates or destinies who would determine the course of a man's life by the weaving of threads that symbolized his birth, the events in his life, and finally his death, with Atropos cutting these threads to mark the last of these. The name "belladonna" comes from the Italian language, meaning 'beautiful lady'; originating either from its usage as a cosmetic to beautify pallid skin, or more probably, from its usage to increase the pupil size in women.

Toxicity 

Belladonna is one of the most toxic plants known, and its use by mouth increases risk in numerous clinical conditions, such as complications of pregnancy, cardiovascular diseases, gastrointestinal disorders, and psychiatric disorders, among others. All parts of the plant contain tropane alkaloids. Roots have up to 1.3%, leaves 1.2%, stalks 0.65%, flowers 0.6%, ripe berries 0.7%, and seeds 0.4% tropane alkaloids; leaves reach maximal alkaloid content when the plant is budding and flowering, roots are most poisonous in the end of the plant's vegetation period. Belladonna nectar is transformed by bees into honey that also contains tropane alkaloids. The berries pose the greatest danger to children because they look attractive and have a somewhat sweet taste. The root of the plant is generally the most toxic part, though this can vary from one specimen to another.

The active agents in belladonna, atropine, hyoscine (scopolamine), and hyoscyamine, have anticholinergic properties. The symptoms of belladonna poisoning include dilated pupils, sensitivity to light, blurred vision, tachycardia, loss of balance, staggering, headache, rash, flushing, severely dry mouth and throat, slurred speech, urinary retention, constipation, confusion, hallucinations, delirium, and convulsions.  In 2009, A. belladonna berries were mistaken for blueberries by an adult woman; the six berries she ate were documented to result in severe anticholinergic syndrome. The plant's deadly symptoms are caused by atropine's disruption of the parasympathetic nervous system's ability to regulate involuntary activities, such as sweating, breathing, and heart rate. The antidote for belladonna poisoning is an anticholinesterase (such as physostigmine) or a cholinomimetic (such as pilocarpine), the same as for atropine.

Atropa belladonna is also toxic to many domestic animals, causing narcosis and paralysis. However, cattle and rabbits eat the plant seemingly without suffering harmful effects. In humans, its anticholinergic properties will cause the disruption of cognitive capacities, such as memory and learning.

Legal status 
Belladonna cultivation is legal in Southern and Eastern Europe, Pakistan, North America, and Brazil. Belladonna leaves and roots can be bought with a medical prescription in pharmacies throughout Germany. In the United States, there is only one approved prescription drug containing belladonna alkaloids such as atropine, and the FDA  regards any over-the-counter products claiming efficacy and safety as an anticholinergic drug, to be illegal.

Uses

Cosmetics 

The common name belladonna originates from its historic use by women, as bella donna is Italian for "beautiful woman". Drops prepared from the belladonna plant were used to dilate women's pupils, an effect considered to be attractive and seductive. Belladonna drops act as a muscarinic antagonist, blocking receptors in the muscles of the eye that constrict pupil size. Belladonna is currently rarely used cosmetically, as it carries the adverse effects of causing minor visual distortions, inability to focus on near objects, and increased heart rate. Prolonged usage was reputed to cause blindness.

Dietary supplements
In the United States, belladonna is marketed as a dietary supplement, typically as an atropine ingredient in over-the-counter cold medicine products. Although such cold medicine products are probably safe for oral use at typical atropine dosages (0.2 milligram), there is inadequate scientific evidence to assure their effectiveness.  By FDA guidelines for supplements, there are no regulated manufacturing standards for cold medicines containing atropine, with some belladona supplements found to contain contaminants.

Medicinal uses 

Scientific evidence to recommend the use of A. belladonna in its natural form for any condition is insufficient, although some of its components, in particular l-atropine, which was purified from belladonna in the 1830s, have accepted medical uses. Donnatal is a prescription pharmaceutical, that combines natural belladonna alkaloids in a specific, fixed ratio with phenobarbital to provide peripheral anticholinergic or antispasmodic action and mild sedation. Donnatal contains 0.0194 mg of atropine. According to the FDA and Donnatal labeling, it is possibly effective for use as adjunctive therapy in the treatment of irritable bowel syndrome (irritable colon, spastic colon, mucous colitis) and acute enterocolitis. Donnatal is not approved by the FDA as being either safe or effective. According to the FDA, Donnatal use has significant risks: it can cause harm to a fetus if administered to a pregnant woman, can lead to heat prostration if used in hot climates, may cause constipation, and may produce drowsiness or blurred vision.

The Towns-Lambert or Bella Donna Cure was a regimen for treating alcohol use disorder in the early 20th century.

Alternative medicine and toxicity risk

Belladonna has been used in herbal medicine for centuries as a pain reliever, muscle relaxer, and anti-inflammatory, and to treat menstrual problems, peptic ulcer disease, histaminic reaction, and motion sickness.

At least one 19th-century eclectic medicine journal explained how to prepare a belladonna tincture for direct administration. In homeopathic practices, belladonna was prescribed by German physician Samuel Hahnemann as a topical medication for inflammation and pain. In the form of Doktor Koster's Antigaspills, belladonna was a homeopathic medication for upset stomach and excessive flatulence. There is insufficient scientific evidence justifying the use of belladonna for these or any other clinical disorders.

In 2010 and 2016, the US Food and Drug Administration warned consumers against the use of homeopathic teething tablets and gels containing belladonna as used for infants and children, stating that the products may be toxic, causing "seizures, difficulty breathing, lethargy, excessive sleepiness, muscle weakness, skin flushing, constipation, difficulty urinating, or agitation".

Recreational drug 
Atropa belladonna and related plants, such as Datura stramonium (commonly known as jimson weed), have occasionally been used as recreational drugs because of the vivid hallucinations and delirium they produce. These hallucinations are most commonly described as very unpleasant, and recreational use is considered extremely dangerous because of the high risk of unintentional fatal overdose. The main psychoactive ingredients are the alkaloids scopolamine and, to a lesser extent, hyoscyamine. The effects of atropine on the central nervous system include memory disruption, which may lead to severe confusion. The major effects of belladonna consumption last for three to four hours; visual hallucinations can last for three to four days, and some negative aftereffects are preserved for several days.

Poison 
The tropane alkaloids of A. belladonna were used as poisons, and early humans made poisonous arrows from the plant. In Ancient Rome, it was used as a poison by Agrippina the Younger, wife of Emperor Claudius, on the advice of Locusta, a woman who specialized in poisons, and Livia, who is rumored to have used it to kill her husband Emperor Augustus.

Macbeth of Scotland, when he was still one of the lieutenants of King Duncan I of Scotland, used it during a truce to poison the troops of the invading Harold Harefoot, King of England, to the point that the English troops were unable to stand their ground and had to retreat to their ships.

Medical historians also suspect that Solomon Northup, a free black man who was kidnapped and sold into slavery in 1841, was poisoned using a combination of Atropa belladonna and laudanum.

Folklore

Flying ointment

In the past, witches were believed to use a mixture of belladonna, opium poppy and other plants, typically poisonous (such as monkshood and hemlock), in flying ointment, which they allegedly applied to help them fly to gatherings with other witches or to experience bacchanalian carousal. Carlo Ginzburg and others have argued that flying ointments were preparations meant to encourage hallucinatory dreaming; a possible explanation for the inclusion of belladonna and opium poppy in flying ointments concerns the known antagonism between tropane alkaloids of belladonna (scopolamine) and opiate alkaloids in the opium poppy, Papaver somniferum (to be specific, morphine), which produces a dream-like waking state (hypnagogia) or potentiated dreams while the user is asleep. This antagonism was known in folk medicine and discussed in traditional medicine formularies. Belladonna is also notable for the unpredictability of its toxic effects.

Female attractiveness
Among the ancient folk traditions of the Romanian (Moldavian) / Ukrainian region of Bukovina in the Carpathians is the ritual for a Bukovinian girl to enhance her attractiveness by making an offering to deadly nightshade. She entered the fields on a Sunday in Shrovetide, clad in her Sunday best, accompanied by her mother and bringing a bag of bread, salt, and brandy. She would dig up a deadly nightshade root and leave the three offerings in its place. As she returned home, she carried the root on the top of her head. On the way both to and from home, she avoided all quarrels and arguments. If asked by anyone on the way back what she was taking home, she would not divulge the truth or the spell would break.

Gallery

See also
 List of poisonous plants
 List of plants poisonous to equines
 Donnatal, a pharmaceutical containing the active alkaloids in belladonna: scopolamine, hyoscyamine, and atropine, as a medication.

References

External links

 

Deliriants
Entheogens
Flora of North Africa
Flora of Western Asia
Herbal and fungal hallucinogens
Medicinal plants of Africa
Medicinal plants of Asia
Medicinal plants of Europe
Oneirogens
Plants described in 1753
Taxa named by Carl Linnaeus
belladonna
Poisonous plants